Orpheo Henk Keizerweerd (born 21 November 1968 in Paramaribo) is a retired Dutch footballer.

During his career he played for IJ.V.V. Stormvogels, SV Huizen, Rodez AF, Oldham Athletic A.F.C., FC Den Bosch, and Real Murcia.

In March 1993, he scored the winning goal in a 1992–93 Coupe de France match against Olympique Alès, leading Rodez AF to the Round of 32 only to be beaten by 9–1 to finalists FC Nantes Atlantique. The same month, he was transferred to Oldham Athletic and appeared in a Premier League match against Liverpool as a substitute.

References

External links

 Profile at Voetbal International

1968 births
Living people
Sportspeople from Paramaribo
Dutch footballers
Surinamese emigrants to the Netherlands
Oldham Athletic A.F.C. players
FC Den Bosch players
Premier League players
Eerste Divisie players
Real Murcia players
Rodez AF players
Association football forwards
Expatriate footballers in England
Expatriate footballers in France
Expatriate footballers in Spain
Dutch expatriate footballers
Dutch expatriate sportspeople in England
Dutch expatriate sportspeople in Spain